Michel Vergnier (born 25 November 1946 in Ennery, Moselle) was a member of the National Assembly of France.  He represented the Creuse department's only constituency until 2017, and is a member of the Socialiste, radical, citoyen et divers gauche.

References

1946 births
Living people
People from Moselle (department)
People from Creuse
Politicians from Grand Est
Unified Socialist Party (France) politicians
Socialist Party (France) politicians
Deputies of the 11th National Assembly of the French Fifth Republic
Deputies of the 12th National Assembly of the French Fifth Republic
Deputies of the 13th National Assembly of the French Fifth Republic
Deputies of the 14th National Assembly of the French Fifth Republic